Ihor Musiyenko (born 22 August 1993) is a Ukrainian athlete specializing in shot put. He represented Ukraine at the 2020 Summer Olympics.

References

1993 births
Living people
Ukrainian male shot putters
Athletes (track and field) at the 2020 Summer Olympics
Olympic athletes of Ukraine
Place of birth missing (living people)